Émile Dottrens (21 July 1900 – 29 September 1990) was a Swiss zoologist and nature conservationist. He became a scientific assistant for zoology at the Natural History Museum of Geneva in 1942 and was the director of that museum from 1953 to 1969. He wrote several articles about the Swiss freshwater fish species from the genus Coregonus. He has worked for the IUCN, for the Swiss nature conservation organisation Pro Natura and at the  Council of Europe. He was the president of the International Commission for the Protection of the Alps (CIPRA) from 1960 to 1968. In addition he was a member of the Swiss Academy of Sciences and the Société de Physique et d'Histoire Naturelle de Genève.

Publications
Emile Dottrens (editor): Le grand livre de la pêche et des poissons. 2 volumes, 1952 
Emile Dottrens: Batraciens et Reptiles d'Europe, 1963 
Emile Dottrens: Sur le Lavaret du lac du Bourget Arch, Si. 3,. fasc. 3, 1950 (scientific article)

References

External links
Short Biography in German

Swiss conservationists
1900 births
1990 deaths
20th-century Swiss zoologists